The Indian state of Himachal Pradesh has three operational airports and one proposed international airport. All the airports are operated by the Airports Authority of India. The airports at Kullu and Dharamshala are proposed for expansion in the future under the UDAN scheme. An airport in Lahaul and Spiti district's Rangrik is also proposed.

The upcoming airport at Mandi is proposed to be the state's first international airport. The airport is expected to be built at an area of 515 acres costing 900 crores (USD $113 million). In August 2022, Himachal Pradesh chief minister Jai Ram Thakur said that the DPR of Mandi Airport is being prepared.

List
The list includes the airports in the Indian state of Himachal Pradesh with their respective ICAO and IATA codes.

References

Himachal Pradesh
Buildings and structures in Himachal Pradesh